Doma vaquera is the traditional working riding discipline of Spain, from which all the working riding styles of the Americas and many of those of Europe appear to derive. Along with rejoneo and acoso y derribo, it is distinct from classical Spanish haute école or doma clásica.

See also
 List of equestrian sports

References

Riding techniques and movements